Ernest Duff (June 2, 1931 - May 27, 2016) was an American businessman, lawyer and former bishop of The Church of Jesus Christ of Latter Day Saints.

He was the founder of Southern Tire Mart, a large independent commercial tire dealership in North America.

Early life
Ernest Ray Duff was born June 2, 1931, in Covington County, Mississippi, the youngest of five children of Carl Melton and Lela May Harvey Duff. His father was a building contractor. His parents were members of the Church of Jesus Christ of Latter-day Saints.

Duff was educated at Columbia High School, where he was president of the student body, and earned a bachelor's degree in law from the University of Mississippi in Oxford. While attending law school at Ole Miss he served again as President of the student body and was inducted into the Hall of Fame.   His Hall of Fame picture can be found at the Lyceum of the university.

Career
In 1973, Duff founded Southern Tire Mart. Duff later founded Duff Capital Investors, the second largest business in Mississippi, which owns twelve companies, with over 10,000 employees and an annual turnover of $2.2 billion.

Personal life
He was married to Bobbie Lou Baggett Duff, and they had three sons, Thomas Milton, James Ernest and Stephen Ray, and one daughter, Jane Elizabeth Duff Thomley, all of who live in Hattiesburg, Mississippi.

He was a former Bishop and member of the High Priest Quorum of the Church of Jesus Christ of Latter-day Saints.

He died on May 27, 2016 at Forrest General Hospital in Hattiesburg. He is buried at Woodlawn Cemetery in Columbia, Mississippi.

References

1931 births
2016 deaths
People from Covington County, Mississippi
People from Hattiesburg, Mississippi
University of Mississippi alumni
American company founders
American leaders of the Church of Jesus Christ of Latter-day Saints
Businesspeople from Mississippi
Latter Day Saints from Mississippi
20th-century American businesspeople